The Skye Museum of Island Life is a museum in Kilmuir, Skye, Scotland, which is dedicated to preserving a township of thatched cottages as they would have been on Skye at the end of the 18th century.

Pictures of the museum

References

External links 

Isle of Skye
Museums in Highland (council area)
Living museums in the United Kingdom
Open-air museums in Scotland
Architecture museums in the United Kingdom
Historic house museums in Scotland
Rural history museums in Scotland